"I'm Gonna Make Her Mine" is a song recorded by Canadian country music artist Jason McCoy. It was released in 1998 as the fourth single from his third studio album, Playin' for Keeps. It peaked at number 15 on the RPM Country Tracks chart in August 1998.

Chart performance

Year-end charts

References

1997 songs
1998 singles
Jason McCoy songs
Universal Music Group singles
Songs written by Chris Lindsey
Songs written by Jason McCoy